Juan Sebastián Quintero Fletcher (born 23 March 1995) is a Colombian footballer who plays as a centre back do Fortaleza.

Career

Deportivo Cali

Sporting Gijón (loan)
On 31 July 2017, after spending four years at Deportivo Cali, the club announced his loan to Sporting de Gijón for one season.

Fortaleza
On 19 January 2019 Quintero signed with Brazilian Série A club Fortaleza.

International career
He was included among the squad of Colombia Olympic football team at the 2016 Summer Olympics, but never played.

Personal life
In November 2018, Quintero and his brother were shot six times in their car when they were driving around Cali. Finally, both were unharmed.

Career statistics

Club

Honours
Deportivo Cali
Categoría Primera A: 2015 Apertura
Superliga Colombiana: 2014

Fortaleza
Campeonato Cearense: 2019, 2020, 2021
Copa do Nordeste: 2019

References

External links
Profile Rio 2016

Profile Winsports

1995 births
Living people
Colombian footballers
Footballers from Cali
Association football defenders
Categoría Primera A players
Segunda División players
Campeonato Brasileiro Série A players
Campeonato Brasileiro Série B players
Deportivo Cali footballers
Sporting de Gijón players
Fortaleza Esporte Clube players
Esporte Clube Juventude players
CR Vasco da Gama players
Footballers at the 2016 Summer Olympics
Olympic footballers of Colombia
Colombian expatriate footballers
Colombian expatriate sportspeople in Spain
Colombian expatriate sportspeople in Brazil
Expatriate footballers in Spain
Expatriate footballers in Brazil